The 9th Annual NFL Honors was an awards presentation by the National Football League that honored its players from the 2019 NFL season. It was held on February 1, 2020, at the Adrienne Arsht Center in Miami, Florida and was pre-recorded for same-day broadcast on Fox in the United States at 8:00 PM/7:00 CT. Five inductees announced during taping of the ceremony will be inducted into the Pro Football Hall of Fame in Canton, Ohio August 5–9, 2021, the event having been postponed due to the COVID-19 pandemic. It was hosted by Steve Harvey for the second consecutive year.

List of award winners

Winners and candidates

Winners are denoted in bold

AP MVP

AP Coach of the Year

AP Offensive Player of the Year

AP Defensive Player of the Year

AP Offensive Rookie of the Year

AP Defensive Rookie of the Year

References

NFL Honors 009
2019 National Football League season
2020 in American football
2020 in sports in Florida